Visättra (formerly Östra Flemingsberg) is a residential area in Flemingsberg in Huddinge municipality and included in the urban area of Stockholm.

Metropolitan Stockholm